Batiaghata Thana Head Quarters Pilot Model Secondary School is a secondary school in Batiaghata Upazila of Khulna District, Bangladesh.

History
The school was founded in 1972. It is first school that has full facility of teaching science commerce and arts.

Facilities
The school provide 6th to 10th grade. It has science, commerce and arts departments. It is also use for both SSC and HSC examinations. It has four modern building.

References

Educational institutions established in 1972
High schools in Bangladesh
1972 establishments in Bangladesh